Oxycodone/ibuprofen (INNs, trade name Combunox) is an oral combination drug formulation of the opioid analgesic oxycodone and the nonsteroidal anti-inflammatory drug (NSAID) ibuprofen that is used in the treatment of chronic and acute pain. This particular drug is supplied in a fixed dose combination tablet which contains Oxycodone Hydrochloride, USP 5 mg with Ibuprofen, USP 400 mg.

Adverse effects

See also
 Oxycodone/paracetamol
 Oxycodone/aspirin
 Hydrocodone/ibuprofen

References

External links 
 

Combination analgesics